Smith County is a county located in the U.S. state of Mississippi. As of the 2020 census, the population was 14,209. Its county seat is Raleigh. Smith County is a prohibition or dry county.

History
Smith County is named for Major David Smith.

Geography

Major highways

  Mississippi Highway 13
  Mississippi Highway 18
  Mississippi Highway 28
  Mississippi Highway 35
  Mississippi Highway 37
  Mississippi Highway 540
  Mississippi Highway 481
  Mississippi Highway 501
  Mississippi Highway 902

Adjacent counties
 Scott County (north)
 Jasper County (east)
 Jones County (southeast)
 Covington County (south)
 Simpson County (west)
 Rankin County (northwest)

National protected area
 Bienville National Forest (part)

Demographics

2020 census

As of the 2020 United States census, there were 14,209 people, 5,820 households, and 4,109 families residing in the county.

2000 census
As of the census of 2000, there were 16,182 people, 6,046 households, and 4,558 families living in the county. The population density was 25 people per square mile (10/km2). There were 7,005 housing units at an average density of 11 per square mile (4/km2).

The racial makeup of the county was 76.11% White, 23.11% Black or African American, 0.11% Native American, 0.10% Asian, 0.04% Pacific Islander, 0.19% from other races, and 0.35% from two or more races. 0.59% of the population were Hispanic or Latino of any race.

There were 6,046 households, out of which 35.90% had children under the age of 18 living with them, 59.60% were married couples living together, 11.90% had a female householder with no husband present, and 24.60% were non-families. 23.00% of all households were made up of individuals, and 11.60% had someone living alone who was 65 years of age or older. The average household size was 2.65 and the average family size was 3.13.

In the county, the population was spread out, with 27.50% under the age of 18, 8.70% from 18 to 24, 27.30% from 25 to 44, 22.60% from 45 to 64, and 13.90% who were 65 years of age or older. The median age was 36 years. For every 100 females there were 95.50 males. For every 100 females age 18 and over, there were 91.60 males.

The median income for a household in the county was $30,840, and the median income for a family was $36,780. Males had a median income of $28,698 versus $20,154 for females. The per capita income for the county was $14,752. About 12.90% of families and 16.90% of the population were below the poverty line, including 22.50% of those under age 18 and 23.70% of those age 65 or over.

Communities

Towns
 Mize
 Raleigh (county seat)
 Taylorsville
 Polkville

Village
 Sylvarena

Politics

See also
 Dry counties
 National Register of Historic Places listings in Smith County, Mississippi

References

External links
 Smith County official website

 
Mississippi counties
1833 establishments in Mississippi
Populated places established in 1833